Edith "Edie" Vonnegut (born 1949 in Schenectady, New York) is an American painter.

Her work—most of which juxtaposes heavenly beings and mundane activities—has been showcased at galleries across the United States, and is featured in the book Domestic Goddesses, along with her humorous commentary.

Personal life
Vonnegut is the daughter of novelist Kurt Vonnegut and his first wife, Jane Marie (Cox), and the sister of Mark Vonnegut and Nanette Vonnegut. She was named for her paternal grandmother, Edith Lieber Vonnegut.

She was once married to television personality Geraldo Rivera and has published under the names Edith Vonnegut, Edith Vonnegut Rivera, and Edith Vonnegut Squibb.

Vonnegut learned transcendental meditation with her mother, Jane, in 1967.

Edith has been married to John Squibb since 1985. She has two sons and three grandchildren.

Partial bibliography
 Nora's Tale, written and illustrated by Edith Vonnegut Rivera. New York: Richard W. Baron publishers, 1975 (dedication: "for Geraldo")

References

External links
 Official website

1949 births
20th-century American painters
20th-century American women artists
21st-century American painters
21st-century American women artists
American people of German descent
American women painters
Living people
Painters from New York (state)
People from Schenectady, New York
Vonnegut family